The 2018 Orange County Board of Supervisors elections was on June 5, 2018 as part of the primary election on June 5, 2018. Three of the five seats of the Orange County, California Board of Supervisors were up for election.

County elections in California are officially nonpartisan. A two-round system will be used for the election, starting with the first round in June; followed by a runoff in November between the top-two candidates in each district. Runoffs are only held if no candidate receives a majority in each district.

Summary of results
 Note: All elections for the Orange County Board of Supervisors are officially nonpartisan. The parties below identify which party label each candidate would have run under if given the option. Candidates all appear on the ballot as nonpartisan.

Percent of seats by party

Summary of results by county supervisorial district
 For districts not displayed, there is no election until 2020.

Close races
Seats where the margin of victory was under 5%:

District 2
District 2 consists of coastal Orange County, including Huntington Beach, Costa Mesa, Cypress, La Palma, Los Alamitos, Newport Beach, Seal Beach, most of Fountain Valley, and neighborhoods in southern Buena Park.

General election

Endorsements

Results

District 4
District 4 consists of inland northwestern Orange County, taking in Fullerton, La Habra, Placentia, Brea, western Anaheim, and most of Buena Park. Incumbent Shawn Nelson retired to run for California's 39th congressional district.

General election

Endorsements

Results

Runoff

Results

District 5
District 5 encompasses southern Orange County, including Aliso Viejo, Laguna Hills, Laguna Niguel, Laguna Woods, Lake Forest, Mission Viejo, Rancho Santa Margarita, San Juan Capistrano, Laguna Beach, San Clemente, and Dana Point.

General election

Results

References

External links
Official campaign websites of second district candidates
Brendon Perkins for Supervisor
Michelle Steel for Supervisor

Official campaign websites of fourth district candidates
Doug Chaffee for Supervisor
Tim Shaw for Supervisor

Official campaign websites of fifth district candidates
Lisa Bartlett for Supervisor

Orange County Board of Supervisors
Orange County Board of Supervisors 2018
Orange County Board of Supervisors